The Chevron B26 is a 2-liter Group 6 sports prototype race car, designed, developed and built by British manufacturer Chevron, in 1973. Over its racing career, spanning 14 years, it won a total of 17 race wins (including 17 additional class wins), achieved 43 podium finishes, and clinched 9 pole positions. It was powered by a naturally-aspirated  Hart 420R four-cylinder engine, developing .

References

Chevron racing cars
Sports prototypes
24 Hours of Le Mans race cars
Sports racing cars